Anatoly Ivanovich Savin (6 April 1920  – 27 March 2016) was a Russian scientist. He was a specialist in the field of information and control automation systems. He was also a Doctor of technical sciences. Savin was the chairman of the Council on the problems of image processing and the scientific director of OJSC Almaz-Antey.

Biography

Anatoly Savin was born in Ostashkov, Russia in 1920. He graduated from the Bauman Moscow Higher Technical School before World War II. After graduating he worked at Gorky Artillery Plant where in 1943 he was appointed Chief Designer. From 1945 he worked for the Soviet nuclear program designing equipment for work with nuclear fuel. In 1951 he was assigned to Design Bureau 1 (future Almaz-Antey), where he worked on the project "Satellite Destroyer", creating a system for intercepting enemy satellites on near-Earth orbits.

In 1971 he became the director of the Central R&D Institute "Kometa" working on distributed information systems with space-based elements. Among his work was the system for early warning of nuclear attack based on the infra red signatures of missile exhausts. He also led development of the naval system for intelligence and target search "Legenda" that would find targets and lead heavy anti-ship missiles using information from external sources.

In 2004-2006 he worked as the Chief Designer of Almaz-Antey corporation. In 2007-2016 he was the Chief Scientist. He died in Moscow, Russia on 27 March 2016.

Recognition

Anatoly Savin was awarded the Hero of the Socialist Labor title (1976), four Orders of Lenin (1945, 1951, 1971 and 1976), he won a Lenin Prize (1972), three Stalin prizes (1946, 1949, 1951), a USSR State Prize (1981), an Order "For Merit to the Fatherland" (1995) and a State Prize of the Russian Federation (1999)

References

External links
 Интервью с Савиным 
 На сайте Концерн ПВО «Алмаз-Антей» 
 На сайте Биографический центр  
 На сайте ЦНИИ «Комета» 

1920 births
2016 deaths
Scientists from Moscow
People from Ostashkovsky District
Heroes of Socialist Labour
Lenin Prize winners
Stalin Prize winners
State Prize of the Russian Federation laureates
Bauman Moscow State Technical University alumni
Burials in Troyekurovskoye Cemetery
Soviet scientists